King Edward VI Handsworth School is a grammar school for girls aged 11–18 located in Handsworth, Birmingham, England. It is part of the Foundation of the Schools of King Edward VI. The school was founded in 1883 as King Edward's Aston on the site where its brother school, King Edward VI Aston School, remains to this day. In 2019 there were 1086 girls on roll. Pupils must pass an 11-plus entrance exam to get into the school. The King Edward Schools are fiercely competitive to get admission to, as only 1 in 10 are successful in passing the entrance exam. The King Edward VI Foundation holds its exams at the same time, and generally a candidate will sit one exam for multiple schools within the foundation. Notable leaver's destinations from this school in previous years have been Birmingham, Aston, Oxford, and Nottingham. The leavers destinations by course were mainly medicine, dentistry, law, business studies and computer science.

The school has a record of high attainment and was deemed 'outstanding' in its last Ofsted inspection. In 2019, the Birmingham Mail ranked it as the second best school in the West Midlands, down from first place in 2018. Since 2017, GCSE pupils at King Edward VI Handsworth have consistently achieved exceptionally good results.  According to the Times League Table, King Edward VI Handsworth School for Girls was ranked 13 in all of the United Kingdom.

History
When King Edward VI Grammar School for Girls opened in 1883 the first head was Margaret Nimmo who had previously been second mistress and the first graduate teacher at Blackheath High School. Thee school was then in the Aston area of Birmingham and it had 300 girls to educate. Half of the schools scholarshops were given to girls from public elementary schools. The education approaches were information, Rote learning and competition.

Margaret Nimmo moved her school to Rosehill Road in Handsworth where it has merged with two others opening again in 1911 in a new building. The new school at Handsworth cost £50,000 to build. The architect was P. B. Chatwin and he designed a building with a number of specialist areas which included the library and the "playroom" (a whole school common-room).

By 1915 the school role was 460. The school's science and gymnastics facilities were poor but the school sent many on to universities. When the school first opened, and for many years afterwards, girls were not permitted to eat in the street and had to wear gloves on the journey to and from school.

In the beginning, the sixth form was very small with as few as 6 pupils in a year. Transfer to King Edward VI High School for Girls for sixth form studies was not unusual.

The school was built on a slope, there are two ground floors, and originally the gymnasium was located in the room on the lower ground floor later used as a Music room.

Since the renovation of the church (bought by the school) into a music centre, this room is now used as an ICT suite.

To celebrate the centenary of the school in 1983 a new block was built to house a meeting room and the changing rooms for the sports field. In 1997 a new Sixth Form block was built with the help of the King Edward VI Foundation fund. In 2005, the new sports hall was built, using sponsorship money from companies such as O2, and a church organ was bought by the school to be renovated and used for music studies. The school also gained specialist performing arts status. 2011 saw the building of a new library by the field; a modern building with a slanting roof and colourful window panes. This includes a mezzanine area upstairs with computers.

Latin was also removed from the curriculum in 2004 and replaced with drama, which had previously been on the curriculum in the late 20th century.

Houses
School Houses were introduced at the beginning of the 20th century, with each House having its own name and colour. Nightingale house was mauve, Kingsley house was green, Fry was pale blue and Browning was brown.

By the 1930s there were awards given for winning competitions against other houses in sports. In the beginning there were House notices in the Playroom and a strict House conduct system.
In 1939 four more Houses were added and they were renamed after the different royal Houses – Windsor, Stuart, Tudor, Hanover, Plantagenet, Lancaster, York, Normandy.

In the 1970s the houses were rearranged again and given names of precious stones – Amethyst, Coral, Garnet and Topaz, because of the school's proximity to the Jewellery Quarter.

At the end of the 1990s they were renamed once more after famous women – Brontë, Pankhurst, Franklin and Nightingale, and when an extra form group was introduced in 2003 the new house of Curie,  then un-introduced in 2005.

In September 2009 the houses were renamed, once again after famous women, this time – Parks (yellow), Keller (blue), Astor (green) and Cavell (red)).

In September 2020, the house Astor (green) was renamed Baker - after Noor Inayat Khan.

The Beacon
An annual magazine written by the lower sixth form is released every year, called The Beacon.

Uniform
The school has a strict code of conduct and the uniform is based around navy blue.

Notable former pupils

Emma B, radio presenter
Felicity Jones, actress
Abigail Kelly, soprano opera and concert singer 
Sarah Manners, actress
Flora Spencer-Longhurst, actress
Zarah Sultana, Labour MP

A society for alumni, the Handsworth Old Edwardians' Society (HOES), has been running since the turn of the 20th century. The society holds meetings for former pupils of all ages three times a year at the school.

References

External links
 

Grammar schools in Birmingham, West Midlands
Educational institutions established in 1883
Girls' schools in the West Midlands (county)
1883 establishments in England

Handsworth, West Midlands
Academies in Birmingham, West Midlands